Saint Lucia maintains friendly relations with the major powers active in the Caribbean, including the United States, the United Kingdom, Canada, and France. Saint Lucia has no extant international disputes, aside from tension resulting from the island's status as a transit point for South American drugs destined for the United States and Europe.

Saint Lucia's Permanent Representative (or ambassador) to the United Nations as of February 22, 2017, was Cosmos Richardson, who was still in office as of January 2018.

History 
St. Lucia participated in the American-led invasion of Grenada in 1983, sending members of its Special Services Unit into active duty. It was subsequently one of eight countries to cast a vote against a United Nations General Assembly motion condemning the invasion.

As a member of CARICOM, St. Lucia strongly backed efforts by the United States to implement UN Security Council Resolution 940, designed to restore democracy to Haiti. St. Lucia agreed to contribute personnel to the multinational force which restored the democratically elected government of Haiti in October 1994.

St. Lucia participated along with 14 other Caribbean nations in a summit with US President Bill Clinton in Bridgetown, Barbados, in May 1997. The summit was the first-ever meeting in the region between the U.S. and Caribbean heads of government, and strengthen the basis for regional cooperation on justice and counternarcotics, finance and development, and trade issues.

Bilateral relations 

List of countries which Saint Lucia established diplomatic relations with:

Former diplomatic relations:  (1 September 1997 – 5 May 2007)

Multilateral relations 
Saint Lucia is a member of several international organizations, including the United Nations, the Commonwealth of Nations, the Organization of American States, the Caribbean Community (CARICOM) and the Organisation of Eastern Caribbean States (OECS).

ACCT (associate), ACP, ALBA, C, Caricom, CDB, CELAC, ECLAC, FAO, G-77, IBRD, ICAO, ICFTU, ICRM, IDA, IFAD, IFC, IFRCS, ILO, IMF, IMO, Intelsat (nonsignatory user), Interpol, IOC, ISO (subscriber), ITU, NAM, OAS, OECS, OPANAL, OPCW, UN, UNCTAD, UNESCO, UNIDO, UPU, WCL, WFTU, WHO, WIPO, WMO, WTrO

See also
List of diplomatic missions in Saint Lucia
List of diplomatic missions of Saint Lucia
Visa requirements for Saint Lucian citizens

References